is a fictional character and the protagonist of Tecmo's Ninja Gaiden action-adventure video game series, in addition to featuring as a player character in the Dead or Alive fighting game franchise by Koei Tecmo and Team Ninja where he serves as the protagonist in Dead or Alive 2. He is a human-dragon hybrid who wields an ancestral weapon called the Dragon Sword, and is the leader of the Hayabusa Ninja Clan. One of Tecmo's most enduring characters, Ryu has appeared on official series merchandise as well as in the feature film DOA: Dead or Alive, and has made many crossover appearances in other games. He has received favorable reception from critics and audiences, and is considered to be one of the most iconic examples of a ninja character in video games.

Attributes
As the son of renowned ninja Joe Hayabusa, Ryu Hayabusa (whose first and last names, respectively, translate literally to "dragon" and "peregrine falcon") is the wielder of the legendary Dragon Sword. Although he appears as a normal human, he is actually a demon-human hybrid whose ancestors drew their blood from the same evil deities such as the Holy Vigoor Emperor, the first game's main antagonist. In the Dead or Alive series, Ryu has befriended fellow ninja Hayate, and joins forces with him along with Kasumi and Ayane, with whom he works to take down the corrupt tournament organizer Victor Donovan.

Appearances

Ninja Gaiden series (1988-1992)

Ryu Hayabusa makes his official debut in the original Ninja Gaiden arcade game released in 1988. In the Nintendo Entertainment System home edition released the same year, he is given a backstory of searching for his missing father who had disappeared to partake in a life-or-death fight. Ken had instructed Ryu in a letter beforehand to travel to the United States to find his friend Dr. Walter Smith, but Ryu encounters Bloody Malth, who had defeated Ken in battle and then subjected him to a brainwashing that causes him to attack his own son, a spell that Ryu manages to break. However, Ken is slain by Malth's superior, an evil sorcerer known as the Jaquio, whom Ryu then kills. Ryu later enters into a relationship with CIA agent Irene Lew, who had refused beforehand to carry out an order to terminate him.

In Ninja Gaiden II: The Dark Sword of Chaos (1990), Ryu foils the Jaquio's demonic master Ashtar's attempt at world domination. In retaliation, Ashtar kidnaps Irene in order to lure Ryu to his home dimension. Ryu defeats Ashtar a second time, but before he can rescue Irene, she is then captured by the Jaquio, who now bears the Dark Sword, the antithesis to Ryu's signature "Dragon Sword" weapon. Having then been killed by Ryu once again, the Jaquio is revived by his blood flowing into his sword, with which he stabs Irene. Her own blood further empowers his sword and conjures a creature known as the Demon; Ryu kills it and Jaquio's Dark Sword is destroyed in the process, but Irene dies from her wounds. She is then brought back to life by ancestral powers flowing through Ryu's Dragon Sword.

1991's Ninja Gaiden III: The Ancient Ship of Doom sees Ryu accused of murdering Irene, but she actually survives the attack, while the culprit is revealed to be a superhuman clone of Ryu called a "Bio-Noid", created by Irene's superior and corrupt CIA director, Foster. After Ryu defeats the double, Foster is killed by H.P. Clancy, who had instructed Ryu to locate a ruin called the "Castle Rock Fortress", which was the base of Foster's Bio-Noid experimentation and has also secretly housed an interdimensional warship that Clancy intends to use for global dominance. Ryu kills Clancy in battle and the ship is destroyed as Ryu escapes with Irene, bringing the first-generation Ninja Gaiden storyline to a close.

The 1991 Sega Game Gear version of Ninja Gaiden scraps the entire narrative of the original series timeline, where someone is trying to steal his dragon sword. He travels to four parts of the world to defeat the demon Shiragane and prevent World War III from starting.

The 1992 Sega Master System version of Ninja Gaiden also eludes the original series timeline, featuring Ryu as a high-ranking member of his ninja clan whose village is massacred while an artifact called the "Sacred Scroll of Bushido" has been stolen. His mission is to regain the scroll from the hands of the evil Shogun of Darkness and his minions.

Ninja Gaiden series (2004-2012)
In Ninja Gaiden (2004), the first release in the second generation of the Ninja Gaiden series, the plot precedes Ryu's acquisition of the Dragon Sword, though it contains story elements similar to the Master System port of the original game in that while Ryu is visiting his uncle Murai, Hayabusa Village is annihilated in his absence and a sword known as the "Dark Dragon Blade" is stolen by the evil Doku, whom Ryu vainly tries to stop before he is slain in his attempt. He is brought back to life by his clan's animal spirit, the falcon, and he searches for the stolen sword while hoping to avenge his clan. He defeats Doku and then his overlord, the Holy Emperor Vigoor, and recovers the blade. In the end, Ryu and his newest accomplice, a fiend-hunter named Rachel, encounter the mysterious "Dark Disciple", who is actually Ryu's traitorous uncle. After Murai's death, Ryu destroys the sword.

The plot of 2008's Ninja Gaiden: Dragon Sword begins with kunoichi Momiji abducted by the rival Black Spider ninja clan. Ryu's objective therein is to find seven Dark Dragonstones, defeating several bosses along the way. At the climax, Doku's former servant Ishtaros steals the stones and defeats Ryu in battle. However, when Kureha—Momiji's sister and a childhood friend of Ryu from the previous game who had died in the village attack—fuses with an object called the Dragon Eye, the stones transform into the Dragon Sword. Ryu defeats Ishtaros and her sister (who takes the shape of a dragon during battle), then frees Momiji and returns her home where they begin training together.

In Ninja Gaiden II (2008), set six months after the events of Dragon Sword, a CIA agent named Sonia warns Ryu of a plot of the Greater Fiends, whose queen, Elizébet, attempts to steal an artifact called the Demon Statue, which is hidden in the Hayabusa ninja village and what she desires in order to resurrect the Archfiend Vazdah, the game's final boss. After his village is razed once again and the statue is stolen, Ryu infiltrates a castle where the object is held. Joe is critically wounded in his battle against Black Spider clan leader Genshin, who then attempts multiple times to kill Ryu thereafter but fails and is slain in his final attempt despite Elizébet having transformed him into one of the game's sub-bosses, the Four Greater Fiends. Before he dies, Genshin gives Ryu a sword called the "Blade of the Archfiend", which Ryu needs to complete his mission. Following the demise of the three other Greater Fiends, Ryu kills Elizébet and Vazdah with both the blade and his own Dragon Sword. At the conclusion, he uses the Archfiend's sword to mark Genshin's gravesite in a cemetery located at the summit of Mount Fuji.

Ryu is summoned by the JSDF in Ninja Gaiden 3 (2012) to assist with the suppression of a terrorist group called the Lords of Alchemy. He pursues the terrorists and their mysterious leader around the world, but realizes he cannot complete his mission without the Dragon Sword. While stalking the group, he also must save a young girl whom he had promised to protect, named Canna. After he succeeds in terminating the group, he destroys another final boss character bent on global destruction and returns the child safely to her mother before disappearing into the shadows. Ryu's story continues in the 2013 release Yaiba: Ninja Gaiden Z, in which he is not playable; instead, he is pursued by the game's "foul-mouthed" protagonist, Yaiba Kamikaze, in his quest for revenge after having been wounded by Ryu's Dragon Sword.

Dead or Alive series
Ryu is additionally a player character in the Dead or Alive games, which take place chronologically years after the Ninja Gaiden series. He is written into the events of each of the Dead or Alive fighting tournaments, starting with the 1996 original game, in which he receives an invitation to the inaugural Dead or Alive tournament which he participates in while searching for fellow ninja, Kasumi, after she broke shinobi code and ran away from her village to get revenge on Raidou who crippled her brother, Hayate. After Raidou's defeat at Kasumi's hands with little aid from Ryu, Kasumi was kidnapped, leaving Ryu and Ayane to search for her. Ryu is the primary protagonist in the 1999 sequel Dead or Alive 2 where he canonically wins the second championship upon learning beforehand that an interdimensional creature named Gohyakumine Bankotsubo, escaped the Tengu world and joined the tournament to wreak chaos on the human world. Ryu with the help from Irene, rescues Kasumi from the Dead or Alive Tournament Executive Committee's (DOATEC) Germany facility, where she was being used as a test subject for the organization's Super Human Development project. Ryu later comes across his lost friend Hayate, now an amnesiac calling himself "Ein", who was also previously kidnapped and unwillingly use as a test subject in DOATEC's Epsilon project. His defeat at Ryu's hands restores parts of his memory. Ryu then destroys Tengu to save the world from his would-be plot, winning the second tournament. He later helps Hayate to fully recover his memories by fighting his own sister Kasumi, then found out together that Genra, Ayane’s foster father became a traitor like Raidou was, such as joining Victor Donovan’s DOATEC anti-Douglas faction, explaining the company’s faction involvement on kidnapping and cloning Kasumi for their Alpha clone project and implanting Hayate with “Epsilon”.

His role in Dead or Alive 3 (2001) is more minor, as he faces off against Hayate, who has become the newest leader of the Mugen Tenshin ninja clan, as well as aiding both Hayate and Ayane against the Omega empowered Genra. In Dead or Alive 4 (2005), Ryu joins fellow clansmen Hayate, Ayane, Kasumi, and other members of the Mugen Tenshin clan to stop the corruption within DOATEC by assaulting and detonating their "Tritower" headquarters. Victor Donovan's hired assassin Christie attempts to stop them, until she is distracted by Helena Douglas, allowing the ninjas to succeed in destroying the building. Ryu returns in 2012's Dead or Alive 5 which chronologically takes place two years after Dead or Alive 4 and Ninja Gaiden 3. Ryu aids Hayate and Ayane in their battle against Donovan's new organization, MIST, who plans to sell modified soldiers to various militia around the world. When Hayate is captured, Ryu sends his falcon to send a message to Kasumi in order to summon her to battle. When she frees Hayate, the four of them destroy the MIST laboratory. As Ryu sense the resurrection of Raidou set up by MIST is approaching in Dead or Alive 6, Ryu warns Kasumi about this referred threat, with MIST’s new target to resurrect Raidou as an undead cyber ninja by kidnapping both of his illegitimate daughters, Ayane, and Honoka. He was approached by the princess of the Tengu world Nyotengu, proving his might as a man who ended Bankotsubo’s crime, sparring her and tells her to leave human world, satisfying her as well. Whereas Hayate, Kasumi and Ayane goes after resurrected Raidou, and Helena goes after Raidou’s resurrector NiCO, Ryu, alongside Bayman and Marie Rose watching over Honoka recovering.

A demo version of DOA5 featuring a playable Ryu and Hitomi was included as a downloadable bonus with pre-orders of both the standard and collector's PlayStation 3 editions of Ninja Gaiden 3, as well as the Xbox 360 version.

Design and gameplay

When asked in 2008 if he would ever explore a "stealth aspect" of Ryu in a future series title, Ninja Gaiden: Dragon Sword designer Tomonobu Itagaki replied, "The kind [of ninja] I like are the ones that go out and kill a bunch of enemies all at once." The Nintendo DS-exclusive game was played by holding the console vertically; Itagaki explained, "We have implemented an immensely intuitive control system. If you use the stylus to slice side-to-side over an enemy, Hayabusa will slash him with his sword, and you can change the type of slash by varying the angle of your slice."

Starting with Ninja Gaiden II, the series' graphic violence greatly increases as Ryu is able to defeat opponents by decapitation or dismemberment. In a 2011 interview with PlayStation.blog, Team Ninja head Yosuke Hayashi described the character's development in Ninja Gaiden 3: "The human side of Ryu Hayabusa comes through ... you see him suffering as a consequence of the murders he has committed and that is when [his] humanity comes through. I believe that, these days, people are looking for more realistic games and that’s not easy to do with Ninja Gaiden, which is heavily based in fantasy." He commented on the gameplay itself, "Within the course of the story, you will ... have a harder time progressing through stages, [but] we have to have the players feel like Ryu is a superhero, the Ryu Hayabusa they know, to make them emphasize with the consequences ... as the game progresses."

Team Ninja wrote that his signature move in Dead or Alive 5 was the "Izuna Drop—a powerful throw that he can perform even from strikes or holds." According to Prima Games' official guide for Dead or Alive Ultimate, Ryu is "fairly fast and has decent power, though he doesn't necessarily excel at either, making him a fairly well-balanced character," adding that he can be useful to a moderate-level player in certain situations. The publisher said for Dead or Alive 4 that he "continues to be one of the top characters in the Dead or Alive series" and can still be played at top levels; he was rated seven out of ten overall. According to GameSpot, Ryu's attacks in DOA4 "are difficult, [but] the bulk of them are actually fairly easy to pull off, and he's quite fast to boot, making him an excellent choice of character for new players."

Other appearances

Other video games
The 2007 Xbox 360 game Halo 3 features an unlockable "Hayabusa" armor set, while players are awarded an in-game unusable replica of Ryu's Dragon Sword upon reaching a specific gamerscore objective. "Hayabusa Ninja" is an alternative costume for the character Max in 2007's Super Swing Golf: Season 2. An 8-bit version of Ryu was included in the first version of the 2010 fan-made Flash game Super Mario Bros. Crossover.

In commemoration of the 2009 merger of Koei and Tecmo, Ryu, Ayane and Momiji were unplayable guest characters in Koei's Dynasty Warriors: Strikeforce released that year. In the company's 2011 hack and slash title Warriors Orochi 3, Ryu, Ayane, Rachel, Momiji and Kasumi appear in another dimension and assist the game's playable characters. Ryu's Ninja Gaiden costume parts were available as exclusive downloads as part of the first-anniversary promotion campaign for Dynasty Warriors Online. Ryu additionally appeared with Ayane in the April 2012 Japan-only release Dynasty Warriors 3DS . Ryu also appeared in Warriors All-Stars. Two side boss characters known as Jin and Ren Hayabusa, based on Ryu’s classic looks appears in Nioh and its followup respectively.

Film

In the 1991 Japan-exclusive OVA film Ninja Ryūkenden, an original adventure loosely based on the early games, Ryu was voiced by Keiichi Nanba, and he was given a red and purple palette as opposed to his solid blue in the NES series, while he is unmasked. Set in New York City, the plot involves a doctor who has supposedly discovered a cure for cancer. He in turn is investigated by a reporter named Sarah, who soon discovers that he is conducting biotechnological experiments on live humans, which possibly involves the power of the Evil Gods, whom Ryu had defeated in the past. This is compounded by the abduction of Irene—the only other returning character from the games, but identified therein only as Sarah's friend—in turn forcing Ryu to become the Dragon Ninja once again and defeat this new enemy and save her. The conclusion has Ryu remaining in America, where he marries Irene and they open an antique shop together.

Ryu was played by Japanese-American actor Kane Kosugi in the 2006 live-action Dead or Alive film adaptation DOA: Dead or Alive. He serves as the love interest of Kasumi after he informs her of Hayate's supposed death, and his fight scenes consist of him defeating a fighter during the tournament, and later stopping Victor Donovan's hired assassin Bayman from stealing the prize money.

Merchandise
Ninja Gaiden II statues of Ryu were released in 2008 by First 4 Figures and NECA. Other action figures based on his Ninja Gaiden incarnations were made available by Kotobukiya in 2005 and One 2 One Collectibles in 2009. A limited-edition figurine of Ryu battling enemy character Regent of the Mask was included along with an art book and soundtrack in the 2012 collector's-edition release of Ninja Gaiden 3. In 2015, a 13" resin statue of Ryu was released by Multiverse Studios, available in variations of either his Ninja Gaiden III or classic series costumes and the base adorned with LED lights.

Ryu has featured on decisively less Dead or Alive merchandise than his female counterparts. Epoch Co. distributed a Japan-exclusive action figure, while Koei Tecmo released a keychain and a three-dimensional poster in 2013 featuring Ryu and the Dead or Alive 5 Plus cast.

Reception

Since his 1988 debut, Ryu Hayabusa has been both critically and publicly received as a popular character in general video gaming. He was nominated in the "Best Character (Best Hero)" category of the 1989 and 1991 Nintendo Power Awards. In 2010, the magazine listed Ryu as one of the best ninja characters to appear on Nintendo consoles. GamesTM called him "easily one of the most athletic characters we've ever seen." In 2007, ScrewAttack ranked him as the sixth-"coolest" video game character. The Age ranked him the tenth-best character ever to appear on the Xbox series of consoles. GameSpot featured Ryu as one of the 64 choices in their 2009 "Greatest Game Hero" poll. UGO Networks included him in a selection of eleven game characters who needed their own live-action movie. In 2012, GamesRadar ranked the "particularly brutal good guy" 26th in their hundred "most memorable, influential, and badass" gaming protagonists. IGN held an online poll in 2008 asking readers whether Ryu or fellow ninja Joe Musashi (from Sega's Shinobi series) would win in a "Hero Showdown"; Ryu received a decisive 82% of the votes. Readers of the Japanese magazine Famitsu voted Ryu 43rd in a 2010 poll deciding the best video game character of all time.

Ryu is additionally esteemed as an iconic video-game ninja character by gaming media such as TechCrunch, Unreality, PC World (who added that Ryu "has the most fearsome arsenal of weapons we’ve ever seen in a video game"), ScrewAttack, Machinima.com, Cheat Code Central said in 2011, "He has been ranked number one on more top-ninja lists than one can count, and he tops [our] list, too." The site ranked Ryu as the fourth-top swordsman in gaming the following year. IGN included Ryu among a selection of characters who warranted inclusion in a hypothetical ultimate-fighting game, as "few videogame heroes make killing look easier or more stylish", while "all other ninja seem lame by comparison." He topped Virgin Media's 2015 selection of the top ten gaming ninjas, but the site countered that the "only problem ... is that he doesn't actually get up to much ninja-like activity." 1UP.com ranked Ryu the second-best gaming ninja behind Joe Musashi in 2004, as that he "was once in the position of struggling to live up to his father's legacy, [but] the new [Ninja Gaiden] game casts him as a ninja master in his own right." In 2008, GamesRadar included him among the top video game assassins in the "ninja" category, despite "never know[ing] Ryu to specifically take on assassination jobs, but we have seen him kick a whole lot of ass in fantastically gruesome ways over the span of his 20-year career." PLAY featured Ryu from Ninja Gaiden Sigma in their 2011 selection of the top ten PlayStation ninjas, for his ability, they wrote, to "decapitate fourteen enemies in the space of twelve seconds." Complex ranked Ryu as the second-"swiftest" ninja in 2012. Lisa Foiles of The Escapist named Ryu ("one sexy ninja") first in her 2014 list of the top five katana wielders. In 2009, GameDaily listed the "badass ninja" in their top 25 video game archetypes, using Ryu as an example, and featured him among the "gaming's greatest patriots" of Japan.

In 2011, GamePro speculated on Ryu's odds of filling the then-upcoming Soulcalibur V's lone guest-character slot (which ultimately went to Ezio Auditore of the Assassin's Creed franchise), opining that despite Soul regulars Taki and Yoshimitsu's "traditional place as the recognizable 'Japanese' characters, neither is a conventional ninja the way Ryu is." In 2012, after Soulcalibur V was released, Elton Jones of Complex included Ryu among fifteen guest characters he wanted in a future series entry. "We've had our fun going ninjitsu crazy with Taki and Natsu, but now it's time for Tecmo's ninja to enter the fray."

See also
Ninja in popular culture

Notes

References

External links
 (DOA5)

Fictional businesspeople in video games
Dead or Alive (franchise) characters
Fictional antiquarians and curators
Fictional blade and dart throwers
Fictional chain fighters
Fictional martial artists in video games
Fictional nunchakuka
Fictional kyūjutsuka
Fictional demon hunters
Fictional hammer fighters
Fictional half-demons
Fictional human hybrids
Fictional kenjutsuka
Fictional Japanese people in video games
Fictional martial arts trainers
Fictional ninja
Fictional Ninjutsu practitioners
Fictional polearm and spearfighters
Fictional stick-fighters
Fictional shopkeepers
Fictional swordfighters in video games
Koei Tecmo protagonists
Male characters in video games
Ninja characters in video games
Ninja Gaiden characters
Video game characters introduced in 1988
Video game characters who can move at superhuman speeds
Video game characters who use magic
Video game characters with accelerated healing
Video game characters with superhuman strength
Video game mascots
Video game bosses